is a Japanese animator, character designer and filmmaker. 

He is known for working with Hayao Miyazaki, Satoshi Kon and Makoto Shinkai.
He was the animation director and character designer for three of the four anime films in the top five box office revenues of Japanese films of all time: Princess Mononoke, Spirited Away, and Your Name.

Career 
Ando took the entrance exam for Studio Ghibli while he was a student at the Nihon University College of Art and was accepted.
At the young age of 25, Ando was chosen to be the chief animation director of Princess Mononoke.
Ando also served as Hayao Miyazaki's right-hand man on Spirited Away in 2001, but left Ghibli after a confrontation with Miyazaki over directing methods.

Ando has been involved in Satoshi Kon's films since 2003, and served as character designer and animation director for Kon's 2006 film  Paprika. 
He worked as a character designer and animation director for Hiroyuki Okiura's A Letter to Momo in 2012. 
He joined Studio Ghibli films for the first time in a long time in 2013 as a member of the animation staff for The Tale of Princess Kaguya. In 2014, he worked on When Marnie Was There as an animation director for Studio Ghibli for the first time in 13 years since Spirited Away, and also co-wrote the script for the film.
He led the animation team for the Makoto Shinkai-directed Your Name in 2016.

Ando makes his directorial debut with Shika no Ō: Yuna to Yakusoku no Tabi, alongside co-director Masayuki Miyaji. He also served as character designer and animation director.

Filmography

Films
 Only Yesterday (1991) – in-between animation
 Porco Rosso (1992) – key animation
 Ocean Waves (1993) – assistant animation director (uncredited), key animation
 Pom Poko (1994) – key animation
 Whisper of the Heart (1995) – key animation
 Princess Mononoke (1997) – character design with his mentor Yoshifumi Kondo, chief animation director
 My Neighbors the Yamadas (1999) – key animation
 Spirited Away (2001) – character design, chief animation director
 Tokyo Godfathers (2003) – animation director, key animation
 Ghost in the Shell 2: Innocence (2004) – key animation
 Tekkonkinkreet (2006) – key animation
 Paprika (2006) – character design, animation director and key animation
 Evangelion: 3.0 You Can (Not) Redo (2012) – key animation
 A Letter to Momo (2012) – character design, animation director, key animation
 The Tale of Princess Kaguya (2013) – animation
 When Marnie Was There (2014) – screenplay, character design, animation director
 The Last: Naruto the Movie (2014) – key animation
 Miss Hokusai (2015) – key animation
 Your Name (2016) – character design with Masayoshi Tanaka, animation director
 Napping Princess (2017) – key animation
 Mary and the Witch's Flower (2017) – key animation
 The Deer King (2022) – director with Masayuki Miyaji, storyboard, character design, chief animation director

TV series
 The Legend of Zorro (1996) – key animation
 Overman King Gainer (2002) – key animation
 Paranoia Agent (2004) – character design, animation director and key animation
 Ghost in the Shell: Stand Alone Complex 2nd GIG (2004) – key animation
 Denno Coil (2007) – key animation
 Bunny Drop (2011) – key animation

OVA
 The Animatrix (2003) (on the Kid's Story segment) – key animation

Music videos
 On Your Mark (1995) – character design, animation director

Web animation
 Japan Animator Expo (2014) – key animation

Video games
 Magic Pengel: The Quest for Color (2002) – key animation

References

External links
 

Studio Ghibli people
Japanese animators
Anime character designers
Anime directors
Japanese animated film directors
Nihon University alumni
1969 births
Living people
People from Hiroshima Prefecture